John D. Petherbridge (22 August 192025 October 2013) was an Australian public servant and diplomat.

References

1920 births
2013 deaths
Ambassadors of Australia to Afghanistan
Ambassadors of Australia to Finland
Ambassadors of Australia to Norway
Ambassadors of Australia to South Korea
Ambassadors of Australia to Sweden
High Commissioners of Australia to Pakistan
University of Sydney alumni